Etlingera araneosa is a monocotyledonous plant species that was first described by John Gilbert Baker, and given its current name by Rosemary Margaret Smith. Etlingera araneosa is part of the genus Etlingera and the family Zingiberaceae. No subspecies are listed in the Catalog of Life.

References 

araneosa
Taxa named by Rosemary Margaret Smith